Wheeler House or Wheeler Home or variations may refer to:

United States 
(by state then city)
 Wheeler House (Tuscaloosa, Alabama), listed on the U.S. National Register of Historic Places (NRHP) in Tuscaloosa County
 Wheeler-Beecher House, Bethany, Connecticut, listed on the NRHP in New Haven County
 Jonathan Wheeler House, Canterbury, Connecticut, NRHP-listed
 Adin Wheeler House and Theodore F. Wheeler Wheelwright Shop, Southbury, Connecticut, listed on the NRHP in New Haven County
 Ephraim Wheeler House, Stratford, Connecticut, NRHP-listed
 Bradley–Wheeler House (also known simply as "Wheeler House"), Westport, Connecticut, NRHP-listed
 Wheeler Opera House, Aspen, Colorado, NRHP-listed
 Wheeler–Stallard House, Aspen, Colorado, NRHP-listed
 Wheeler House (Denver), formerly listed on the NRHP in West Denver
 Wheeler-Evans House, Oviedo, Florida, listed on the NRHP in Florida
 Wheeler–Kohn House, Chicago, Illinois, listed on the NRHP in Illinois
 Price/Wheeler House, Springfield, Illinois, listed on the NRHP in Illinois
 Wheeler–Stokely Mansion, Indianapolis, Indiana, listed on the NRHP in Indiana
 John R. Wheeler Jr. House, Dunlap, Iowa, listed on the NRHP in Harrison County
 Wheeler-Merriam House, Concord, Massachusetts, listed on the NRHP
 Wheeler-Minot Farmhouse, Concord, Massachusetts, listed on the NRHP
 Dyke-Wheeler House (also known simply as "Wheeler House"), Gloucester, Massachusetts, listed on the NRHP
 Aaron Wheeler House, Rehoboth, Massachusetts, listed on the NRHP
 Ingalls–Wheeler–Horton Homestead Site, Rehoboth, Massachusetts, listed on the NRHP
 Wheeler–Ingalls House, Rehoboth, Massachusetts, listed on the NRHP
 Albert H. Wheeler House, Southbridge, Massachusetts, NRHP-listed
 Nathaniel S. Wheeler House, Onsted, Michigan, NRHP-listed
 Burton and Lulu Wheeler Cabin, Apgar, Montana, listed on the NRHP in Montana
 Burton K. Wheeler House, Butte, Montana, NRHP-listed
 Wheeler Home (Loudonville, New York), NRHP-listed
 Menzo Wheeler House, Chaumont, New York, NRHP-listed
 George and Addison Wheeler House, East Bloomfield, New York, NRHP-listed
 Wheeler House Complex, Leonardsville, New York, NRHP-listed
 Pfeiffer-Wheeler American Chestnut Cabin, Portville, New York, NRHP-listed
 William E. Wheeler House, Portville, New York, NRHP-listed
 Millar-Wheeler House, Utica, New York, NRHP-listed
 John Wheeler House (Murfreesboro, North Carolina), listed on the National Register of Historic Places in Hertford County
 Dr. Henry Wheeler House, Grand Forks, North Dakota, NRHP-listed
 John Wheeler House (Berea, Ohio), listed on the National Register of Historic Places in Cuyahoga County, Ohio
 J. A. Wheeler House, Independence, Oregon, listed on the NRHP in Oregon
 Cora Bryant Wheeler House, Portland, Oregon, NRHP-listed
 James E. Wheeler House, Portland, Oregon, NRHP-listed
 William Wheeler House (Victoria, Texas), NRHP-listed

See also
John Wheeler House (disambiguation)
 William Wheeler House (disambiguation)
 Wheeler (disambiguation)